Joseph Anthony Solecki (born August 27, 1993) is an American professional mixed martial artist. Solecki currently competes in the Lightweight division for the Ultimate Fighting Championship (UFC).

Background 
Solecki began training Brazilian Jiu-Jitsu at the age of 6 years old. Joe states:
“I got into BJJ at age 6 by accident, I wanted to do karate like the power rangers. My parents sent my brother for a year or two at first, but we ended up enrolling in a school where the instructor had begun training BJJ and he switched the entire curriculum to grappling by the time I signed up”.

Mixed martial arts career

Early career 
Solecki started his professional as a pretty accomplished amateur with a 5–0 record. With all of those 5 amateur wins coming via submission or TKO. In his MMA debut at CFFC 61, he submitted Chris Rollins via rear-naked choke in the first round. Solecki also tapped out Andrew Cherico at CFFC 62 and Kevin Perez at CFFC 63, respectively. Although Joe was on an 8 fight win streak, that came to an end when he faced Cesar Balmaceda. That fight went Cesar’s way via unanimous decision. He defeated Eric Calderon via TKO in round one at Warfare MMA 16. Then at CFFC 69, Solecki submitted Johnson Jajoute in the first round via rear-naked choke. He then came up against Nikolas Motta and unfortunately Solecki lost this fight via a finish. He tapped out Gilbert Patrocinio via triangle choke in round one at ROC 66. At CFFC 73, Solecki defeated Jacob Bohn via unanimous decision. In the main event of Dana White's Contender Series 19 on July 9, 2019, Solecki submitted James Wallace in the first round to pick up his sixth submission win as a professional along with a UFC contract.

Ultimate Fighting Championship 
Solecki made his UFC debut against veteran Matt Wiman on December 7, 2019 at UFC on ESPN: Overeem vs. Rozenstruik. He won the fight via unanimous decision.

Solecki was expected to face Austin Hubbard on June 20, 2020 at UFC on ESPN: Blaydes vs. Volkov. However, at the last minute, Solecki was replaced by promotional newcomer Max Rohskopf.

The bout with Hubbard was rescheduled on August 22, 2020 at UFC on ESPN: Munhoz vs. Edgar. Solecki won the fight by submission in the first round.

Solecki faced Jim Miller on April 10, 2021 at UFC on ABC: Vettori vs. Holland. He won the bout via unanimous decision.

Solecki faced Jared Gordon on October 2, 2021 at UFC Fight Night 193. He lost the fight via split decision.

Solecki faced Alex da Silva Coelho on June 4, 2022 at UFC Fight Night 207. He won the bout via majority decision after a point deduction was given to da Silva due to repeatedly locking his toes in the fence.

Solecki was scheduled to face Benoît Saint-Denis on February 18, 2022 at  UFC Fight Night 219. However, Saint-Denis withdrew from the bout citing ankle injury.  He was replaced by promotional newcomer Carl Deaton III and the bout was moved to UFC Fight Night 220 a week later. Solecki won the fight via technical submission in round two. This win earned him the Performance of the Night bonus.

Championships and accomplishments
 Ultimate Fighting Championship
 Performance of the Night (One time)

Personal life
Solecki and his wife Kacey, have a daughter, born 2020.

Mixed martial arts record 

|-
|Win
|align=center|13–3
|Carl Deaton III
|Technical Submission (rear-naked choke)
|UFC Fight Night: Muniz vs. Allen
|
|align=center|2
|align=center|4:55
|Las Vegas, Nevada, United States
| 
|-
|Win
|align=center|12–3
|Alex da Silva Coelho
|Decision (majority)
|UFC Fight Night: Volkov vs. Rozenstruik
|
|align=center|3
|align=center|5:00
|Las Vegas, Nevada, United States
|
|-
|Loss
|align=center|11–3
|Jared Gordon
|Decision (split)
|UFC Fight Night: Santos vs. Walker
|
|align=center|3
|align=center|5:00
|Las Vegas, Nevada, United States
|
|-
|Win
|align=center|11–2
|Jim Miller
|Decision (unanimous)
|UFC on ABC: Vettori vs. Holland
|
|align=center|3
|align=center|5:00
|Las Vegas, Nevada, United States
|
|-
| Win
| align=center| 10–2
| Austin Hubbard
|Submission (rear-naked choke)
|UFC on ESPN: Munhoz vs. Edgar
|
|align=center|1
|align=center|3:51
|Las Vegas, Nevada, United States
|
|-
| Win
| align=center| 9–2
| Matt Wiman
|Decision (unanimous)
|UFC on ESPN: Overeem vs. Rozenstruik 
|
|align=center|3
|align=center|5:00
|Washington, D.C., United States
|
|-
| Win
| align=center| 8–2
|James Wallace
|Technical Submission (guillotine choke)
| Dana White's Contender Series 19
| 
| align=center| 1
| align=center| 3:49
| Las Vegas, Nevada, United States
|
|-
| Win
| align=center|7–2
| Jacob Bohn
|Decision (unanimous)
|CFFC 73
|
|align=center|3
|align=center|5:00
|Philadelphia, Pennsylvania, United States
|
|-
| Win
| align=center|6–2
| Gilbert Patrocinio
|Submission (triangle choke)
| Ring of Combat 66
| 
| align=center|1
| align=center|2:37
| Atlantic City, New Jersey, United States
|
|-
| Loss
| align=center| 5–2
| Nikolas Motta
| KO (punches)
| 864 Fighting Championship 5
| 
| align=center| 3
| align=center| 1:08
| Greenville, South Carolina, United States
|
|-
| Win
| align=center| 5–1
| Johnson Jajoute
| Submission (rear-naked choke)
| CFFC 69
|
|align=Center|1
|align=center|3:23
|Atlantic City, New Jersey, United States
| 
|-
| Win
| align=center| 4–1
| Eric Calderon
| TKO
|Warfare MMA 16
|
|align=center|1
|align=center|0:01
|North Myrtle Beach, South Carolina, United States
|
|-
| Loss
| align=center| 3–1
| Cesar Balmaceda
| Decision (unanimous)
|CFFC 65
|
|align=center|3
|align=center|5:00
|Philadelphia, Pennsylvania, United States
| 
|-
| Win
| align=center| 3–0
| Kevin Perez
| Submission (rear-naked choke)
| CFFC 63
| 
| align=center| 1
| align=center| 1:08
| Atlantic City, New Jersey, United States
| 
|-
| Win
| align=center| 2–0
| Andrew Chirico
| Submission (rear-naked choke)
| CFFC 62
| 
| align=center| 1
| align=center| 2:07
| Philadelphia, Pennsylvania, United States
|
|-
| Win
| align=center| 1–0
| Chris Rollins
| Submission (rear-naked choke)
| CFFC 61
| 
| align=center| 1
| align=center| 2:48
| Atlantic City, New Jersey, United States
|

See also 
 List of current UFC fighters
 List of male mixed martial artists

References

External links 
  
  

Living people
1993 births
American male mixed martial artists
Lightweight mixed martial artists
Mixed martial artists from New Jersey
Mixed martial artists utilizing Brazilian jiu-jitsu
Ultimate Fighting Championship male fighters
American practitioners of Brazilian jiu-jitsu
People awarded a black belt in Brazilian jiu-jitsu
People from Wenonah, New Jersey
Sportspeople from Gloucester County, New Jersey